Baeckea brevifolia is a species of flowering plant in the family Myrtaceae and is endemic to south-eastern New South Wales. It is a shrub with narrow egg-shaped to oblong leaves and white to pink flowers with nine to fifteen stamens.

Description

Taxonomy
The species was first formally described in 1807 by Edward Rudge who gave it the name Leptospermum brevifolium in Transactions of the Linnean Society of London. In 1828, Augustin Pyramus de Candolle changed the name to Baeckea brevifolia in his Prodromus Systematis Naturalis Regni Vegetabilis. The specific epithet (brevifolia) means "short-leaved".

Distribution and habitat
This baeckea is a common heathland shrub that mainly grows on sandstone soils on the coast and nearby ranges of New South Wales between Woy Woy and Milton.

References

Flora of New South Wales
brevifolia
Plants described in 1807
Taxa named by Edward Rudge